A Heavy Nite With... is the debut album by British band Relaxed Muscle fronted by Pulp's Jarvis Cocker, using the pseudonym Darren Spooner. The other member is Jason Buckle. It has been alleged that Jason Buckle is a pseudonym for Pulp guitarist Richard Hawley, but this is not the case - Hawley does contribute guitar to the album, however, under the pseudonym Wayne Marsden.

Relaxed Muscle recorded three other songs not included on this album: "Branded" and "Year Of The Dog" as B-sides and "This Is As Good As It Gets," on the compilation album The Electronic Bible.

Track listing

Personnel
 Darren Spooner - Vox
 JP Buckle - Music
 Wayne Marsden - Extra Guitars ("Rod Of Iron" and "Battered")

References

Rough Trade Records albums
2003 debut albums